Peter Isaac Diamondstone (December 19, 1934 – August 30, 2017) was an American lawyer and socialist politician from the state of Vermont, best known as a perennial candidate and co-founder of the Liberty Union Party. He ran for various Vermont political offices, always unsuccessfully, in every election cycle from 1970 until 2016.

Early life
Diamondstone was born in the New York borough of The Bronx in 1934 and raised in the borough of Queens. His father was a dentist and a socialist. In 1944, at the age of nine, Diamondstone got a job passing out flyers for the fourth presidential campaign of Franklin D. Roosevelt. He served in the U.S. Army from 1954 to 1956.

Diamondstone received a J.D. degree from the University of Chicago Law School in 1960 and moved to Vermont in 1968, where he soon entered the political scene.

Career
Diamondstone, along with former U.S. Congressman William H. Meyer, Bernie Sanders (who is a current U.S. Senator), and others, founded the Liberty Union Party in 1970. From then until his death, he ran every two years for various political offices, never receiving more than 8% of the vote in general elections.

While Diamondstone usually carried the Liberty Union banner in his political campaigns, he occasionally ran under other party labels and even entered Democratic and Republican primaries. In 2000, he was the official Democratic nominee for U.S. House of Representatives and placed a distant third, behind Bernie Sanders (running as an independent) and Republican Karen Ann Kerin.

Diamondstone arrived late to a debate for U.S. Congress in 1980, and was told he would not be able to participate. He remained in the debate area and was arrested. He was also arrested in 1996 while attempting to participate in a debate for U.S. Congress, for which he was a candidate. In 2006, Diamondstone was escorted off stage and charged with disorderly conduct after cursing at students in the audience and repeatedly speaking past his allotted time during a U.S. Senate debate.

Once a friend and political ally of Bernie Sanders, the two gradually drifted apart as Sanders transitioned into mainstream electoral politics. In 1984, Diamondstone passed out anti-Sanders flyers, calling him a "Quisling" and criticizing him for endorsing Democratic presidential nominee Walter Mondale. He did not endorse Sanders' 2016 presidential candidacy and referred to him as a war criminal for supporting the 1999 NATO bombing of Yugoslavia.

Political positions
Diamondstone was a supporter of Vermont seceding from the United States. He advocated for community ownership of the means of production as well as nationalization of the healthcare system and increasing the number of paid leave and paid vacation days. Diamondstone also believed in disbanding the Vermont National Guard and replacing it with a civilian militia. He opposed water fluoridation, genetically modified food, and the HPV vaccine, which he referred to as a "Big Pharma sham". Diamondstone was an advocate of eliminating the voting age. He also wanted to open hearings to investigate conspiracy theories relating to the September 11 attacks.

Diamondstone, while coming from a Jewish family, was an opponent of Zionism, saying, "Zionism has nothing to do with Judaism. As a matter of fact, probably about 90 percent of all Zionists are Christians." He endorsed withdrawing all military aid to Israel and criticized "war crimes and genocide" perpetrated by the Israeli government.

Ideologically, he identified as a "nonviolent revolutionary socialist". He argued it is an imperative for capitalism to end, to be replaced by a socialist economic system.

Personal life
Diamondstone married Doris Lake in 1957. They had four children. He was an atheist.

Diamondstone died at his home in Dummerston, Vermont on August 30, 2017, at age 82. According to his wife, he was suffering from several ailments, including heart and kidney diseases, and had been recently released from the hospital. Diamondstone also suffered from leg sores which required him to wear shorts to stay comfortable.

Upon his death, Bernie Sanders said, "I first met Peter Diamondstone over 45 years ago. While I have not had any real contact with him for many, many years, I have the feeling that he never changed. Peter was a very independent thinker, unafraid to express his (often controversial) point of view on any subject. As a result, he forced people to examine and defend their own positions. No small thing. In his own way, Peter played an important role in Vermont politics for many decades."

Electoral history
Scattering votes are not included.

1970s
Vermont Attorney General Democratic primary, 1970
 Thomas P. Salmon (Democratic) – 19,513 (66.97%)
 Peter Diamondstone (D) – 9,553 (32.79%)

Vermont Attorney General election, 1970
 Jim Jeffords (Republican) – 85,515 (57.83%)
 Thomas P. Salmon (D) – 60,373 (40.83%)
 Peter Diamondstone (Liberty Union) – 1,987 (1.34%)

Vermont Attorney General Republican primary, 1972
 Kimberly B. Cheney (R) – 20,307 (33.62%)
 Natt L. Divoll (R) – 18,300 (30.30%)
 Robert E. West (R) – 13,095 (21.68%)
 Sten E. Lium (R) – 5,009 (8.29%)
 Peter Diamondstone (R) – 3,669 (6.07%)

Vermont Attorney General election, 1972
 Kimberly B. Cheney (R) – 101,480 (57.89%)
 Richard Gadbois (D) – 67,884 (38.72%)
 Peter Diamondstone (LU) – 5,989 (3.36%)

Vermont's at-large congressional district Democratic primary, 1974
 Francis J. Cain (D) – 9,415 (41.37%)
 Margaret A. Lucenti (D) – 3,384 (14.87%)
 John J. Welch (D) – 3,004 (13.20%)
 Francis J. Esposito (D) – 2,804 (12.32%)
 Dennis J. Morrisseau (D) – 2,623 (11.52%)
 Peter Diamondstone (D) – 1,426 (6.27%)

Vermont Attorney General election, 1976
 M. Jerome Diamond (D) – 89,839 (53.17%)
 John P. Meaker (R) – 71,960 (42.59%)
 Peter Diamondstone (LU) – 7,153 (4.23%)

United States House of Representatives election in Vermont, 1978
 Jim Jeffords (R) – 90,668 (75.26%)
 Sarah Marie Dietz (D) – 23,228 (19.28%)
 Peter Diamondstone (LU) – 6,505 (5.40%)

1980s
U.S. House of Representatives election in Vermont, 1980
 Jim Jeffords (R) – 154,274 (79.24%)
 Robin Lloyd (Citizens) – 24,758 (12.72%)
 Peter Diamondstone (LU) – 15,218 (7.82%)

U.S. House of Representatives election in Vermont, 1982
 Jim Jeffords (R) – 114,191 (69.23%)
 Mark A. Kaplan (D) – 38,296 (23.22%)
 Robin Lloyd (C) – 6,409 (3.89%)
 Peter Diamondstone (LU) – 2,794 (1.69%)
 Morris Earle (Small Is Beautiful) – 1,733 (1.05%)
 George E. Trask (Libertarian) – 1,407 (0.85%)

U.S. House of Representatives election in Vermont, 1984
 Jim Jeffords (R) – 148,025 (65.41%)
 Anthony Pollina (D) – 60,360 (26.67%)
 Jim Hedbor (L) – 9,359 (4.14%)
 Peter Diamondstone (LU) – 4,858 (2.15%)
 Morris Earle (SIB) – 3,313 (1.46%)

U.S. House of Representatives election in Vermont, 1986
 Jim Jeffords (R) – 168,403 (89.12%)
 John T. McNulty (Pro-life) – 7,404 (3.92%)
 Peter Diamondstone (LU) – 7,060 (3.74%)
 Morris Earle (SIB) – 5,850 (3.10%)

U.S. House of Representatives election in Vermont, 1988
 Peter Plympton Smith (R) – 98,937 (41.21%)
 Bernie Sanders (Independent) – 90,026 (37.50%)
 Paul N. Poirier (D) – 45,330 (18.88%)
 Jim Hedbor (L) – 3,109 (1.30%)
 Peter Diamondstone (LU) – 1,455 (0.61%)
 Morris Earle (SIB) – 1,070 (0.45%)

1990s
Vermont's at-large congressional district Democratic primary, 1990
 Dolores Sandoval (D) – 5,979 (41.27%)
 Peter Diamondstone (D) – 5,711 (39.42%)
 Bernie Sanders (write–in, D) – 2,005 (13.84%)

U.S. House of Representatives election in Vermont, 1990
 Bernie Sanders (I) – 117,522 (56.00%)
 Peter Plympton Smith (R) – 82,938 (39.52%)
 Dolores Sandoval (D) – 6,315 (3.01%)
 Peter Diamondstone (LU) – 1,965 (0.94%)

U.S. House of Representatives election in Vermont, 1992
 Bernie Sanders (I) – 162,724 (57.78%)
 Tim Philbin (R) – 86,901 (30.86%)
 Lewis E. Young (D) – 22,279 (7.91%)
 Peter Diamondstone (LU) – 3,660 (1.30%)
 John Dewey (Natural Law) – 3,549 (1.26%)
 Douglas M. Miller (Freedom for LaRouche) – 2,049 (0.73%)

Vermont Attorney General election, 1994
 Jeffrey Amestoy (R) – 176,857 (87.14%)
 Peter Diamondstone (LU) – 11,210 (5.52%)
 Joseph P. Mulcahy (NL) – 7,753 (3.73%)
 Ted Talcott (Vermont Grassroots) – 7,062 (3.48%)

U.S. House of Representatives election in Vermont, 1996
 Bernie Sanders (I) – 140,678 (55.23%)
 Susan W. Sweetser (R) – 83,021 (32.60%)
 Jack Long (D) – 23,830 (9.36%)
 Thomas J. Morse (L) – 2,693 (1.06%)
 Peter Diamondstone (LU) – 1,965 (0.77%)
 Robert Melamede (VG) – 1,350 (0.53%)
 Norio Kushi (NL) – 812 (0.32%)

Vermont's at-large congressional district Democratic primary, 1998
 Bernie Sanders (write-in, D) – 1,661 (47.88%)
 Mark Candon (write–in, D) – 524 (15.11%)
 Jack Long (write–in, D) – 465 (13.40%)
 Peter Diamondstone (write–in, D) – 352 (10.15%)

Vermont's at-large congressional district Republican primary, 1998
 Mark Candon (R) – 23,101 (48.43%)
 Jack Long (R) – 15,716 (32.95%)
 Peter Diamondstone (R) – 8,327 (17.46%)

U.S. House of Representatives election in Vermont, 1998
 Bernie Sanders (I) – 136,403 (63.40%)
 Mark Candon (R) – 70,740 (32.88%)
 Matthew S. Mulligan (VG) – 3,464 (1.61%)
 Peter Diamondstone (LU) – 2,153 (1.00%)
 Robert Maynard (L) – 2,097 (0.98%)

2000s
Vermont's at-large congressional district Democratic primary, 2000
 Peter Diamondstone (D) – 20,539 (90.94%)
 Bernie Sanders (write–in, D) – 1,337 (5.92%)

U.S. House of Representatives election in Vermont, 2000
 Bernie Sanders (I) – 196,118 (69.21%)
 Karen Ann Kerin (R) – 51,977 (18.34%)
 Peter Diamondstone (LU, D, Organic Life) – 14,918 (5.27%)
 Stewart Skrill (I) – 11,816 (4.17%)
 Jack Rogers (VG) – 4,799 (1.69%)
 Daniel H. Krymkowski (L) – 2,978 (1.05%)

Governor of Vermont Progressive primary, 2002
 Michael J. Badamo (Progressive) – 931 (54.16%)
 Peter Diamondstone (P) – 412 (23.97%)

Vermont gubernatorial election, 2002
 Jim Douglas (R) – 103,436 (44.94%)
 Doug Racine (D) – 97,565 (42.39%)
 Cornelius Hogan (I) – 22,353 (9.71%)
 Cris Ericson (Marijuana) – 1,737 (0.76)
 Michael Badamo (P) – 1,380 (0.60%)
 Joel W. Williams (L) – 938 (0.41%)
 Patricia Hejny (VG) – 771 (0.34%)
 Marilynn Christian (Restore Justice-Freedom) – 638 (0.28%)
 Peter Diamondstone (LU) – 625 (0.27%)
 Brian Pearl (I) – 569 (0.25%)

Governor of Vermont Progressive primary, 2004
 Martha Abbott (write–in, P) – 375 (55.07%)
 Peter Diamondstone (P) – 190 (27.90%)

Vermont gubernatorial election, 2004
 Jim Douglas (R) – 181,540 (58.74%)
 Peter Clavelle (D) – 117,327 (37.96%)
 Cris Ericson (M) – 4,221 (1.37%)
 Patricia Hejny (I) – 2,431 (0.79%)
 Harland Arthur Macia III (L) – 2,263 (0.73%)
 Peter Diamondstone (LU) – 1,298 (0.42%)

United States Senate election in Vermont, 2006
 Bernie Sanders (I) – 171,638 (65.41%)
 Rich Tarrant (R) – 84,924 (32.36%)
 Cris Ericson (I) – 1,735 (0.66%)
 Craig Hill (Green) – 1,536 (0.59%)
 Peter Moss (Anti–Bushist) – 1,518 (0.58%)
 Peter Diamondstone (LU) – 801 (0.31%)

Vermont gubernatorial election, 2008
 Jim Douglas (R) – 170,492 (53.43%)
 Anthony Pollina (I) – 69,791 (21.87%)
 Gaye Symington (D) – 69,534 (21.79%)
 Tony O'Connor (Cheap Renewable Energy) – 3,106 (0.97%)
 Sam Young (I) – 2,490 (0.78%)
 Peter Diamondstone (LU) – 1,710 (0.54%)
 Cris Ericson (I) – 1,704 (0.53%)

2010s
United States Senate election in Vermont, 2010
 Patrick Leahy (D) – 151,281 (64.33%)
 Len Britton (R) – 72,699 (30.91%)
 Daniel Freilich (I) – 3,544 (1.51%)
 Cris Ericson (M) – 2,731 (1.16%)
 Stephen J. Cain (I) – 2,356 (1.00%)
 Peter Diamondstone (LU, Socialist) – 1,433 (0.61%)
 Johenry Nunes (I) – 1,021 (0.43%)

United States Senate election in Vermont, 2012
 Bernie Sanders (I) – 207,848 (71.00%)
 John MacGovern (R) – 72,898 (24.90%)
 Cris Ericson (M) – 5,924 (2.02%)
 Peter Diamondstone (LU) – 2,511 (0.86%)
 Peter Moss (Peace & Prosperity) – 2,452 (0.84%)
 Laurel LaFramboise (VoteKISS) – 877 (0.30%)

Vermont gubernatorial election, 2014
 Peter Shumlin (D) – 89,509 (46.36%)
 Scott Milne (R) – 87,075 (45.10%)
 Dan Feliciano (L) – 8,428 (4.37%)
 Em Peyton (I) – 3,157 (1.64%)
 Peter Diamondstone (LU) – 1,673 (0.87%)
 Bernard Peters (I) – 1,434 (0.74%)
 Cris Ericson (I) – 1,089 (0.56%)

United States Senate election in Vermont, 2016
 Patrick Leahy (D) – 192,243 (59.99%)
 Scott Milne (R) – 103,637 (32.34%)
 Cris Ericson (M) – 9,156 (2.86%)
 Jerry Trudell (I) – 5,223 (1.63%)
 Peter Diamondstone (LU) – 3,241 (1.01%)

References

1934 births
2017 deaths
20th-century American lawyers
20th-century American politicians
21st-century American lawyers
21st-century American politicians
Activists from Vermont
American pacifists
Jewish American atheists
Jewish American attorneys
Jewish socialists
Liberty Union Party politicians
People from Brattleboro, Vermont
People from Dummerston, Vermont
Politicians from Queens, New York
University of Chicago alumni
Vermont Democrats
Vermont Progressive Party politicians
Vermont Republicans
Vermont lawyers
Vermont socialists